Hansschlegelia beijingensis is a Gram-negative, aerobic and rod-shaped bacterium species from the genus of Hansschlegelia which has been isolated from rhizosphere soil from a watermelon plant in Beijing in the Daxing District in China.

References

Further reading

External links
Type strain of Hansschlegelia beijingensis at BacDive -  the Bacterial Diversity Metadatabase

Methylocystaceae
Bacteria described in 2013